Rolling to You is a 2018 French comedy film directed by Franck Dubosc.

Cast 
 Franck Dubosc as Jocelyn
 Alexandra Lamy as Florence
 Elsa Zylberstein as Marie
 Gérard Darmon as Max
  as Julie
 Laurent Bateau as Lucien
 Claude Brasseur as Jocelyn's father
 François-Xavier Demaison as The priest

Accolades

References

External links
 

2018 films
2018 comedy films
French comedy films
2010s French films